The second season of Top Chef Brasil premiered on Wednesday, July 15, 2020 at  (BRT / AMT) on RecordTV.

On March 17, 2020, due to the COVID-19 pandemic, RecordTV announced that filming had been suspended midway through episode 5, with plans to resume once it was safe to do so. Shooting resumed on July 25, under social distancing measures and regular testing, until August 9, 2020.

Contestants
Source:

Contestant progress

 
 
Key

Main guest appearances 
Episode 1
 Chef Giovanna Perrone, season 1 winner
Episode 2
 Chef Paul Cho
 Chef Rodrigo Oliveira
Episode 3
 Chef Murakami
Episode 4
 Chef Luisa Abram
Episode 5
 Xuxa Meneghel
Episode 7
 Chef Fred Caffarena

Ratings and reception

Brazilian ratings
All numbers are in points and provided by Kantar Ibope Media.

References

External links
 Tof Chef Brasil 2 on R7.com

2020 Brazilian television seasons
Television productions suspended due to the COVID-19 pandemic
Brasil, Season 2